Monika Zehrt (later Landgraf, born 29 September 1952) is a retired East German sprinter who specialized in the 400m. At the 1972 Olympics she won gold medals in the individual 400m and 4 × 400m relay, setting an Olympic and a world record, respectively. Zehrt also won relay golds at the 1971 European Championships and the 1970 and 1973 European Cup. During her career she set one world record in the 400 m and four in the 4 × 400m. After retiring in 1974, she earned a degree in external trade and a leading position at a furniture company. She married, but then divorced Jochen Landgraf, a 400m hurdler.

References

1952 births
Living people
People from Riesa
East German female sprinters
Athletes (track and field) at the 1972 Summer Olympics
Olympic athletes of East Germany
Olympic gold medalists for East Germany
World record setters in athletics (track and field)
Recipients of the Patriotic Order of Merit
European Athletics Championships medalists
Medalists at the 1972 Summer Olympics
Olympic gold medalists in athletics (track and field)
Olympic female sprinters
Sportspeople from Saxony